Darreh Abbas (also Romanized as Darreh ‘Abbās and Darreh-ye ‘Abbās; also known as Dār-i-‘Abbās) is a village in Fakhrud Rural District, Qohestan District, Darmian County, South Khorasan Province, Iran. At the 2006 census, its population was 362, in 110 families.

References 

Populated places in Darmian County